"Las Vegas" is a 2005 song written by Tim Larsson, Tobias Lundgren, Johan Fransson and Niklas Edberger and performed by Martin Stenmarck. It was the winning song at Melodifestivalen 2005 and represented  at the Eurovision Song Contest 2005 in Kyiv, Ukraine, where it finished 19th of the 24 competing songs in the final.

Melodifestivalen and the Eurovision Song Contest

"Las Vegas" participated in the third heat of the 2005 Melodifestivalen which was held on 26 February 2005 at the Isstadion indoor arena in Skellefteå. The song was the last of the eight competing entries to perform and directly qualified to the contest final as one of the two songs which received the most telephone votes. On 12 March, during the final held at the Globe Arena in Stockholm, Stenmarck was the first of the ten competing acts to perform, and "Las Vegas" won the contest with 212 points, receiving the highest number of votes from the regional juries and the second highest number of public votes.

Sweden automatically qualified to the final of the 2005 Eurovision Song Contest in Kyiv, Ukraine courtesy of its 5th place finish at the previous year's contest. "Las Vegas" was performed in the final on 21 May 2005, with Sweden drawn to perform in fourteenth position of the 24 competing entries. Stenmark subsequently finished in nineteenth place, receiving 30 points in total.

Charts

Weekly charts

Year-end charts

References

Eurovision songs of Sweden
Songs about Las Vegas
Number-one singles in Sweden
Melodifestivalen songs of 2005
Eurovision songs of 2005
Songs written by Tobias Lundgren
Songs written by Tim Larsson
Songs written by Johan Fransson (songwriter)
Martin Stenmarck songs
2005 songs
Songs written by Niklas Edberger